Caladenia atroclavia, commonly known as the black-clubbed spider orchid, is a plant in the orchid family Orchidaceae and is endemic to south-eastern Queensland. It is a ground orchid with a single hairy leaf and a pale greenish-cream coloured flower with dark purple clubs and red patches on the petals.

Description
Caladenia atroclavia is a terrestrial, perennial, deciduous, herb with an underground tuber and a single hairy leaf.

The flower is pale greenish-cream with red blotches on the petals and is reported to smell like an overheated electric motor. The lower part of the dorsal sepal has a reddish stripe in its centre and ends with a thick, dark reddish-purple glandular tip. The petals and sepals spread widely near their bases but have drooping ends. It is green and erect in the lower part, then dark maroon and curved nearer the end. There are 6 to 8 linear-shaped teeth along the edges, the longest about  but decreasing in size towards the end. Flowering occurs in October.

Taxonomy and naming
Caladenia atroclavia was first formally described in 1998 by David Jones and Mark Clements and the description was published in Austrobaileya. The type specimen was collected near Wyberba in the Darling Downs district. The specific epithet (atroclavia) refers to the prominent dark-coloured ends of the sepals.

Distribution and habitat
This caladenia grows in well-drained gravel derived from granite in woodland and swampy areas. Only four populations with a total of about 70 plants are known, occurring in the Girraween National Park and in the Wyberba area.

Conservation
Caladenia atroclavia is classified as "Endangered" under the Queensland Government Nature Conservation Act and the Commonwealth Government Environment Protection and Biodiversity Conservation Act 1999 (EPBC) Act. The main threat to its survival is the feral pig Sus scrofa.

Ecology
Research at the University of Southern Queensland has shown that the mycorrhizal fungus associated with this species of orchid belongs to the Sebacinaceae complex.

References

atroclavia
Plants described in 1998
Endemic orchids of Australia
Orchids of Queensland
Taxa named by David L. Jones (botanist)
Taxa named by Mark Alwin Clements